Eble VI of Ventadorn was the son of Eble V of Ventadorn and Marguerite or Marie de Turenne (daughter of viscount Raymond II of Turenne and of Elise de Séverac). She is better known as Maria de Ventadorn, trobairitz and patron of troubadours. Eble VI married Dauphine de la Tour d'Auvergne, and had a daughter, Alix or Alasia. Alix married Robert d'Auvergne, count of Clermont, a great-grandson of the long-lived Dauphin d'Auvergne.

Viscounts of Ventadour
13th-century French people
Year of birth missing
Year of death missing